Éric Lavaine (born 1966) is a French film director and screenwriter.

Filmography

References

External links

 

 

Living people
French film directors
French male screenwriters
French screenwriters
1966 births